The 2013–14 The Citadel Bulldogs basketball team represented The Citadel, The Military College of South Carolina in the 2013–14 NCAA Division I men's basketball season. The Bulldogs were led by fourth year head coach Chuck Driesell and played their home games at McAlister Field House. They played a member of the Southern Conference. They finished the season 7–26, 2–14 in SoCon play to finish in last place. They advanced to the quarterfinals of the SoCon tournament where they lost to Wofford.

Preseason
The Citadel was picked to finish last in the 11 team SoCon by both the media and coaches.  No Bulldogs were named to the Coaches' preseason All-Conference team.

Recruiting

Roster
Despite a pre-season decision to give up basketball due to back injuries, P. J. Horgan returned to the Bulldogs on January 6, 2014.

Schedule
The Bulldogs played games against Tennessee, Wake Forest, Navy, and Nebraska, in addition to the All-Military Classic featuring VMI, Army, and Air Force.  The home slate included fourteen games, including cross-town rival College of Charleston and in-state rival Presbyterian.  The SoCon schedule included home and home series with Appalachian State, Davidson, Furman, Georgia Southern, Western Carolina, and Wofford.  Chattanooga and Samford visited McAlister Field House while The Citadel traveled to Elon and UNC Greensboro.

The Bulldogs endured a 17-game losing streak, longest within one season in school history, before winning their final two regular season games.  The Citadel then claimed just their twelfth ever SoCon Tournament win over UNC Greensboro before recording their sixty first tournament loss against Wofford in the quarterfinals.

|-
! colspan=8 style=""|Regular season

|-
! colspan=8 style=""|

References

The Citadel Bulldogs basketball seasons
Citadel
Citadel
Citadel